Scoparia clavata is a species of moth of the family Crambidae. It is endemic to New Zealand.

Taxonomy
This species was described by Alfred Philpott in 1912. However the placement of this species within the genus Scoparia is in doubt. As a result, this species has also been referred to as Scoparia (s.l.) clavata.

Description
The wingspan is about 26 mm. The forewings are white, irrorated with brownish-ochreous. The costa is brownish and there is a black median streak from the base of the costa, as well as a black streak in the disc above the middle. All streaks are margined with brownish-ochreous. The hindwings are shining white, but ochreous at the termen. Adults have been recorded on wing in December.

References

Moths described in 1912
Moths of New Zealand
Scorparia
Endemic fauna of New Zealand
Endemic moths of New Zealand